Armando Barabino (16 September 1883 – 10 June 1970) was an Italian painter. His work was part of the painting event in the art competition at the 1936 Summer Olympics.

References

1883 births
1970 deaths
20th-century Italian painters
Italian male painters
Olympic competitors in art competitions
Painters from Genoa
20th-century Italian male artists